Count Illarion Ivanovich Vorontsov-Dashkov (27 May 1837 – 15 January 1916) was a notable representative of the Vorontsov family. He served as Minister of Imperial Properties in 1881-97 and the Governor-General of the Caucasus Viceroyalty (1801–1917) in 1905–15.

Career

Illarion Vorontsov was born on 27 May 1837 in Saint Petersburg. He took part in the conquest of Central Asia in the 1860s and was appointed Major General in 1866. He was in charge of the Hussar regiment of the Leub Guard in 1867–74. He was on friendly terms with the future Alexander III of Russia and, following Alexander's father's assassination, established a counter-revolutionary squad, or "holy druzhina", whose members included Konstantin Pobedonostsev, Nicholas Pavlovich Ignatiev, and Mikhail Katkov.

Alexander III put Vorontsov-Dashkov in charge of the imperial court and made him Full General of Cavalry. He also was made responsible for imperial stud farms and vineyards. Following Nicholas II's coronation, he was dislodged from the office of Minister of Imperial Properties but was appointed to the State Council of Imperial Russia instead. The Russian Revolution of 1905 recalled Vorontsov to active service, and he ascended to the helm of the Viceroyalty of the Caucasus.

As Russia's second-to-last viceroy of the Caucasus, Vorontsov-Dashkov implemented several reformist policies, but his time in office was marred by a general era of revolution, war, and social upheaval.

He was officially in charge of the victorious Russian forces in the Battle of Sarikamish during the early months of World War I, although the effective command lay with General Alexander Myshlayevsky. In September 1915 he was removed from command and replaced with Grand Duke Nicholas.  He died on 15 January 1916 in his Vorontsov Palace.

Family

He married in 1867 Countess Elizaveta Andreevna Shuvalova, daughter of Count Andrei Petrovich Shuvalov. His youngest son Alexander's descendants represent the only continuation of the Vorontsov family in the male line.

Awards and honours

Russian decorations
 Knight of St. Anna, 4th class, 1861; 3rd Class, 1864; 1st Class, 1870
 Gold Sword for Bravery, 4 June 1862
 Knight of St. Vladimir, 4th Class with Swords and Bow, 1865; 3rd Class with Swords, 1867; 2nd Class, 1874; 1st Class, 1894
  Knight of St. George, 4th class, for distinguished service during the war, 27 June 1867; 3rd Class "For the valiant skilful leadership of the Caucasian Army, whose heroic exploits achieved brilliant military success in actions against the Turks", 15 August 1915
 Knight of St. Stanislaus, 1st Class, 1868
 Knight of the White Eagle, with Swords, 1878
 Knight of St. Alexander Nevsky, 1883; in Diamonds, 1888
 Knight of St. Andrew, 14 May 1896; in Diamonds, 1904
 Portraits of the Emperors Alexander II and Alexander III, in Diamonds, 1908
 Portrait of Emperor Alexander III, in Diamonds, 21 February 1913

Foreign decorations

Ancestry

References

External links

Online museum of the Vorontsov Family

1837 births
1916 deaths
Military personnel from Saint Petersburg
Politicians of the Russian Empire
Members of the State Council (Russian Empire)
Imperial Russian Army generals
Russian people of World War I
1900s in Georgia (country)
1910s in Georgia (country)
Russian monarchists
Illarion
Recipients of the Order of St. George of the Third Degree
Recipients of the Gold Sword for Bravery
Recipients of the Order of St. Anna, 1st class
Recipients of the Order of St. Vladimir, 1st class
Recipients of the Order of the White Eagle (Russia)
Grand Crosses of the Order of Saint Stephen of Hungary
Grand Crosses of the Order of Franz Joseph
Grand Crosses of the Order of the Dannebrog
Grand Croix of the Légion d'honneur
Recipients of the Order of the Cross of Takovo
Honorary Knights Grand Cross of the Royal Victorian Order
Commanders Grand Cross of the Order of the Sword